Juhan Ulfsak (born 18 April 1973 in Tallinn) is an Estonian actor.

Since 1998 he is an actor in Von Krahl Theatre. Besides theatre roles he has played on several films. His father was actor Lembit Ulfsak.

Selected filmography
 2005 Stiilipidu (feature film; role: Erki)
 2006 The Power of Fear (feature fil; role: Head sheriff)
 2006 Ruudi (feature film; role: Beauty contest host)
 2007 Jan Uuspõld läheb Tartusse  (feature film; role: Valev)
 2011 Idioot (feature film; role: Ippolit)
 2012 Seenelkäik (feature film; role: Zäk)
 2012 Üksik saar (feature film; role: Olaf, professor's son)
 2015 Roukli (feature film)
 2016 Päevad, mis ajasid segadusse (feature film; role: Juulius)
 2017 Mehetapja/Süütu/Vari (feature film; role: Aleksander Kross (Süütu))
 2017 Miami (feature film; role: Eduard)
 2018 Eia jõulud Tondikakul (feature film; role: Raiesmiku Raivo)
 2018 Seltsimees laps (feature film; role: Paul Varik)
 2020 Viimased (feature film; role: Butcher)
 2022 Erik Kivisüda (feature film; role: Külmking)

References

Living people
1973 births
Estonian male stage actors
Estonian male film actors
Estonian male television actors
20th-century Estonian male actors
21st-century Estonian male actors
Male actors from Tallinn